Argyresthia tatrica is a moth of the family Yponomeutidae. It is found in the Tatra Mountains in Slovakia.

Ecology
The larvae feed on Larix decidua.

References

Moths described in 2003
Endemic fauna of Slovakia
tatrica
Moths of Europe